Frasnes-lez-Buissenal is a village of Wallonia and a district of the municipality of Frasnes-lez-Anvaing, located in the province of Hainaut, Belgium. 

In 1864, foresters digging out the roots of a tree near the village unearthed the Frasnes Hoard.

Former municipalities of Hainaut (province)